The United States Census Bureau (USCB), officially the Bureau of the Census, is a principal agency of the U.S. Federal Statistical System, responsible for producing data about the American people and economy. The Census Bureau is part of the U.S. Department of Commerce and its director is appointed by the President of the United States.

The Census Bureau's primary mission is conducting the U.S. census every ten years, which allocates the seats of the U.S. House of Representatives to the states based on their population. The bureau's various censuses and surveys help allocate over $675 billion in federal funds every year and it assists states, local communities, and businesses make informed decisions. The information provided by the census informs decisions on where to build and maintain schools, hospitals, transportation infrastructure, and police and fire departments.

In addition to the decennial census, the Census Bureau continually conducts over 130 surveys and programs a year, including the American Community Survey, the U.S. Economic Census, and the Current Population Survey. Furthermore, economic and foreign trade indicators released by the federal government typically contain data produced by the Census Bureau.

==Legal mandate==

Article One of the United States Constitution (section II) directs the population be enumerated at least once every ten years and the resulting counts used to set the number of members from each state in the House of Representatives and, by extension, in the Electoral College. The Census Bureau now conducts a full population count every ten years in years ending with a zero and uses the term "decennial" to describe the operation. Between censuses, the Census Bureau makes population estimates and projections.

In addition, Census data directly affects how more than $400 billion per year in federal and state funding is allocated to communities for neighborhood improvements, public health, education, transportation and more. The Census Bureau is mandated with fulfilling these obligations: the collecting of statistics about the nation, its people, and economy. The Census Bureau's legal authority is codified in Title 13 of the United States Code.

The Census Bureau also conducts surveys on behalf of various federal government and local government agencies on topics such as employment, crime, health, consumer expenditures, and housing. Within the bureau, these are known as "demographic surveys" and are conducted perpetually between and during decennial (10-year) population counts. The Census Bureau also conducts economic surveys of manufacturing, retail, service, and other establishments and of domestic governments.

Between 1790 and 1840, the census was taken by marshals of the judicial districts. The Census Act of 1840 established a central office which became known as the Census Office. Several acts followed that revised and authorized new censuses, typically at the 10-year intervals. In 1902, the temporary Census Office was moved under the Department of Interior, and in 1903 it was renamed the Census Bureau under the new Department of Commerce and Labor. The department was intended to consolidate overlapping statistical agencies, but Census Bureau officials were hindered by their subordinate role in the department.

An act in 1920 changed the date and authorized manufacturing censuses every two years and agriculture censuses every 10 years. In 1929, a bill was passed mandating the House of Representatives be reapportioned based on the results of the 1930 Census. In 1954, various acts were codified into Title 13 of the U.S. Code.

By law, the Census Bureau must count everyone and submit state population totals to the U.S. President by December 31 of any year ending in a zero. States within the Union receive the results in the spring of the following year.

Data collection

Census regions and divisions

The United States Census Bureau defines four statistical regions, with nine divisions. The Census Bureau regions are "widely used...for data collection and analysis". The Census Bureau definition is pervasive.

Regional divisions used by the United States Census Bureau:
 Region 1: Northeast
 Division 1: New England (Connecticut, Maine, Massachusetts, New Hampshire, Rhode Island, and Vermont)
 Division 2: Mid-Atlantic (New Jersey, New York, and Pennsylvania)
 Region 2: Midwest (Prior to June 1984, the Midwest Region was designated as the North Central Region.)
 Division 3: East North Central (Illinois, Indiana, Michigan, Ohio, and Wisconsin)
 Division 4: West North Central (Iowa, Kansas, Minnesota, Missouri, Nebraska, North Dakota, and South Dakota)
 Region 3: South
 Division 5: South Atlantic (Delaware, Florida, Georgia, Maryland, North Carolina, South Carolina, Virginia, Washington D.C., and West Virginia)
 Division 6: East South Central (Alabama, Kentucky, Mississippi, and Tennessee)
 Division 7: West South Central (Arkansas, Louisiana, Oklahoma, and Texas)
 Region 4: West
 Division 8: Mountain (Arizona, Colorado, Idaho, Montana, Nevada, New Mexico, Utah, and Wyoming)
 Division 9: Pacific (Alaska, California, Hawaii, Oregon, and Washington)

The current system was introduced for the 1910 census, but other ways of grouping states were used historically by the Census Bureau. The first of these was introduced after the 1850 census by statistician and later census superintendent J. D. B. De Bow. He published a compendium where the states and territories were grouped into five "great division", namely the Middle, New England, the Northwestern, the Southern, and the Southwestern. Unsatisfied with this system, De Bow devised another one four years later, with states and territories grouped into an Eastern, Interior, and Western "great section", each divided into a northern and southern half called "great divisions". In the following decades, several other systems were used, until the current one was introduced in 1910. This system has seen only minor changes: The North region was divided into a Northeast and a North Central region in 1940, Alaska and Hawaii were both added to the Pacific division in the West region upon statehood in 1959, and the North Central region was renamed the Midwest in 1984.

Uses of census data

Many federal, state, local and tribal governments use census data to:
 Decide the location of new housing and public facilities,
 Examine the demographic characteristics of communities, states, and the US,
 Plan transportation systems and roadways,
 Determine quotas and creation of police and fire precincts, and
 Create localized areas for elections, schools, utilities, etc.
 Gathers population information every 10 years

Data stewardship
The United States Census Bureau is committed to confidentiality and guarantees non-disclosure of any addresses or personal information related to individuals or establishments. Title 13 of the U.S. Code establishes penalties for the disclosure of this information. All Census employees must sign an affidavit of non-disclosure prior to employment.

The bureau cannot share responses, addresses or personal information with anyone, including the United States or foreign governments, or law enforcement agencies such as the IRS or the FBI or Interpol. "Providing quality data, for public good—while respecting individual privacy and, at the same time, protecting confidentiality—is the Census Bureau's core responsibility"; "Keeping the public's trust is critical to the Census's ability to carry out the mission as the leading source of quality data about the Nation's people and economy." Only after 72 years does the information collected become available to other agencies or the general public. Seventy-two years was picked because usually by 72 years since the census is taken, most participants would be deceased.

Despite these guarantees of confidentiality, the Census Bureau has some history of disclosures to other government agencies. In 1918, the Census Bureau released individual information regarding several hundred young men to the Justice Department and Selective Service system for the purpose of prosecutions for draft evasion. During World War II, the United States Census Bureau assisted the government's Japanese American internment efforts by providing confidential neighborhood information on Japanese-Americans. The bureau's role was denied for decades but was finally proven in 2007.

United States census data are valuable for the country's political parties; Democrats and Republicans are highly interested in knowing the accurate number of persons in their respective districts. These insights are often linked to financial and economic strategies that are central to federal, state and city investments for locations of particular populations. Such apportionments are designed to distribute political power across neutral spatial allocations; however, "because so much is at stake, the census also runs the risk of being politicized."

Such political tensions highlight the complexity of identity and classification; some argue that unclear results from the population data "is due to distortions brought about by political pressures." One frequently used example includes ambiguous ethnic counts, which often involves underenumeration and/or undercounting of minority populations. Ideas about race, ethnicity and identity have also evolved in the United States, and such changes warrant examination of how these shifts have impacted the accuracy of census data over time.

The United States Census Bureau began pursuing technological innovations to improve the precision of its census data collection in the 1980s. Robert W. Marx, the Chief of the Geography Division of the USCB teamed up with the U.S. Geological Survey and oversaw the creation of the Topologically Integrated Geographic Encoding and Referencing (TIGER) database system. Census officials were able to evaluate the more sophisticated and detailed results that the TIGER system produced; furthermore, TIGER data is also available to the public. And while the TIGER system does not directly amass demographic data, as a geographic information system (GIS), it can be used to merge demographics to conduct more accurate geospatial and mapping analysis.

In July 2019 the Census Bureau deprecated American FactFinder, which was decommissioned in March 2020 after 20 years of being the agency's primary tool for data dissemination. The new platform is data.census.gov.

Ongoing surveys

Throughout the decade between censuses, the bureau conducts surveys to produce a general view and comprehensive study of the United States' social and economic conditions. Staff from the Current Surveys Program conduct over 130 ongoing and special surveys about people and their characteristics. A network of professional field representatives gathers information from a sample of households, responding to questions about employment, consumer expenditures, health, housing, and other topics.

Surveys conducted between decades:

Other surveys conducted
The Census Bureau collects information in many other surveys and provides the data to the survey sponsor for release. These sponsors include:
 Bureau of Justice Statistics (BJS)
 Bureau of Labor Statistics (BLS)
 Bureau of Transportation Statistics (BTS)
 Department of Housing and Urban Development (HUD)
 National Center for Education Statistics (NCES)
 National Center for Health Statistics (NCHS)
 National Science Foundation (NSF)
 Social Security Administration (SSA)

Organizational structure

Since 1903, the official census-taking agency of the United States government has been the Bureau of the Census. The Census Bureau is headed by a director, assisted by a deputy director and an executive staff composed of the associate directors.

The Census Bureau headquarters has been in Suitland, Maryland, since 1942. A new headquarters complex completed there in 2007 supports over 4,000 employees.<ref
></ref
>    The bureau operates regional offices in 6 cities:<ref
></ref
> New York City, Philadelphia, Chicago, Atlanta, Denver, and Los Angeles. The National Processing Center is in Jeffersonville, Indiana. Additional temporary processing facilities facilitate the decennial census, which employs more than a million people. The cost of the 2000 Census was $4.5 billion. During the years just prior to the decennial census, parallel census offices, known as "Regional Census Centers" are opened in the field office cities. The decennial operations are carried out from these facilities. The Regional Census Centers oversee the openings and closings of smaller "Area Census Offices" within their collection jurisdictions. In 2020, Regional Census Centers oversaw the operation of 248 Area Census Offices, The estimated cost of the 2010 Census is $14.7 billion.

On January 1, 2013, the Census Bureau consolidated its twelve regional offices into six. Increasing costs of data collection, changes in survey management tools such as laptops and the increasing use of multi-modal surveys (i.e. internet, telephone, and in-person) led the Bureau to consolidate. The six regional offices that closed were Boston, Charlotte, Dallas, Detroit, Kansas City and Seattle. The remaining regional offices are New York City, Philadelphia, Chicago, Atlanta, Denver, and Los Angeles.

The Census Bureau also runs the Census Information Center cooperative program that involves 58 "national, regional, and local non-profit organizations". The CIC program aims to represent the interests of underserved communities.

Computer equipment

The 1890 census was the first to use the electric tabulating machines invented by Herman Hollerith. For 1890–1940 details, see  In 1946, knowing of the bureau's funding of Hollerith and, later, Powers, John Mauchly approached the bureau about early funding for UNIVAC development. A UNIVAC I computer was accepted by the bureau in 1951.

Handheld computers (HHC)
Historically, the census information was gathered by census takers going door-to-door collecting information in a ledger. Beginning in 1970 information was gathered via mailed forms. To reduce paper usage, reduce payroll expense and acquire the most comprehensive list of addresses ever compiled, 500,000 handheld computers (HHCs) (specifically designed, single-purpose devices) were used for the first time in 2009 during the address canvassing portion of the 2010 Decennial Census Project. Projected savings were estimated to be over $1 billion.

Security precautions

The HHC was manufactured by Harris Corporation, an established Department of Defense contractor, via a controversial contract with the Department of Commerce. Secured access via a fingerprint swipe guaranteed only the verified user could access the unit. A GPS capacity was integral to the daily address management and the transfer of gathered information. Of major importance was the security and integrity of the populace's private information.

Success and failure
Enumerators (information gatherers) that had operational problems with the device understandably made negative reports. During the 2009 Senate confirmation hearings for Robert Groves, President Obama's Census Director appointee, there was much mention of problems but very little criticism of the units. In rural areas, the sparsity of cell phone towers caused problems with data transmission to and from the HHC. Since the units were updated nightly with important changes and updates, operator implementation of proper procedure was imperative.

Notable alumni

 John Shaw Billings
 Rattan Chand
 W. Edwards Deming
 Davis Rich Dewey
 Halbert L. Dunn
 Murray Feshbach
 Robert Groves
 Henry Gannett
 Morris H. Hansen
 Joseph Adna Hill
 Herman Hollerith
 Leslie Kish
 John Wesley Langley
 Bernard Malamud
 Thomas Commerford Martin
 Warren Mitofsky
 Ivan Petrof
 Cyrus Guernsey Pringle
 Richard M. Scammon
 Thelma Strabel
 Howard Sutherland

See also

 List of U.S. states and territories by population
 List of metropolitan statistical areas
 List of United States cities by population
 List of United States counties and county equivalents
 United States Office of Management and Budget
Primary statistical area (list)
Combined statistical area (list)
Core-based statistical area (list)
Metropolitan statistical area (list)
Micropolitan statistical area (list)
 List of United States urban areas
 PATCOB
 Title 13 of the United States Code
 Title 15 of the Code of Federal Regulations
 Director of the United States Census Bureau
 Data.gov
 USAFacts
 Statistical Abstract of the United States

References

External links

 United States Census Bureau
 Census Bureau in the Federal Register
 USCB population estimates
 USCB History
 U.S. and World Population Clocks – POPClocks
 Geographic Areas Reference Manual
 
 
 

72-year rule
 PDF of Availability of Census Records About Individuals
 PDF of Letter from Census Bureau Director, Roy V. Peel to Archivist of the United States, Wayne C. Grover, concerning the 72-year lapse between collection and release of decennial census records
 PDF of Letter from Archivist of the United States, Wayne C. Grover to Census Bureau Director Roy V. Peel, in reply to Peel's August 1952 letter

 
1903 establishments in Washington, D.C.
United States census
Government agencies established in 1903
National statistical services
Organizations based in Washington, D.C.
Statistical organizations in the United States
Federal Statistical System of the United States